Atylotus plebeius  is a Palearctic species of horse fly in the family Tabanidae.

References

External links
Images representing Atylotus plebeius

Tabanidae
Insects described in 1817
Diptera of Europe
Taxa named by Carl Fredrik Fallén